Angelo Motta (8 September 1890 – 26 December 1957) was an Italian entrepreneur, founder of the food company . He is associated with the commercial production of the sweet yeast bread panettone.

Biography
Motta was a Milanese pastry chef before leaving for military service during The Great War. After the war, in 1919 he opened his first bakery starting production of the Panettone, a typically Milanese cake, first in the form of a handmade version and later expanding his production to make panettone at an industrial plant. Motta and his rival panettone maker Gioacchino Alemagna are credited with the industrialisation of panettone from its Milanese origins to a staple of the Italian Christmas. Production had expanded considerably by 1930 and a new large factory was required on the outskirts of town to replace the four small bakeries that Motta was using. In 1935 l’illustrazione italiana reported that the new factory had a conveyor belt measuring thirty metres and large industrial ovens to keep up with production.

Motta's edge in the production of panettone was to create a distinctive high dome shape to his bread that replaced the older style of flatter panettone as the standard. His startling success saw his company expand considerably during the interwar years with Motta foods introducing new breads including a celebratory Easter bread known as a Colomba di Pasqua, a dove shaped yeast bread that uses panettone yeast but contains less fruit. In many companies, panettone became the de rigueur holiday gift to give to staff. Top artists were commissioned by Motta to immortalize his bread in advertisements. Prices were slashed to attract yet more consumers. It is estimated that panettone is now sold in seventy five countries.

After the war, Motta's company also manufactured ice cream including the famous brands Mottarello and Coppa del Nonno (Grandfather's cup). Motta's continued as an independent company until 1970 when it became state controlled.
 
The Motta and Alemagna brands are now owned by Bauli  an Italian bakery company based in Verona having previously passed through the hands of Nestlé for a period in the late 1990s.

He died in December 1957.

Awards

In 1939 Angelo Motta was awarded Knight of the Equestrian Order of the Holy Sepulchre a prestigious catholic chivalric order.

Motta was also a Grand Officer of the Order of Merit of the Italian Republic.

See also
 List of Milanese people

References

1890 births
1957 deaths
Businesspeople from Milan
Bakers
Knights of the Holy Sepulchre
20th-century Italian businesspeople